The Australian cricket team toured India in February and March 2017 playing four Test matches. India won the series 2–1. With the series victory, India held all the series titles against all of the other Test sides at the same time.

The Board of Control for Cricket in India (BCCI) confirmed the dates of the tour in October 2016. DRS was used for the first time in the Border–Gavaskar Trophy in this series, although Hot Spot was not used. Australia played the first Test match in Pune, just one day after they played a Twenty20 International match against Sri Lanka in Adelaide.

Squads

Mitchell Marsh suffered a shoulder injury during the second Test and was ruled out of the rest of the series. Marcus Stoinis was named as his replacement. Hardik Pandya was left out the squad for the last two matches of the series due to a shoulder injury. Mitchell Starc was ruled out of the last two Tests with a foot injury. Pat Cummins was named as his replacement. Ahead of the fourth Test, Shreyas Iyer was added to India's squad as cover for Virat Kohli, who was suffering with a shoulder injury.

Tour match

Three-day match: India A v Australia

Test series

1st Test

2nd Test

3rd Test

4th Test

Decision referral
The second Test witnessed a controversy when the Australian team was accused of having taken help from the dressing room in using the Decision Review System (DRS). Australia's captain Steve Smith admitted to having looked in the direction of the dressing room for assistance when he was given out leg before wicket (lbw) off Umesh Yadav when he was on 28 by the on-field umpire Nigel Llong, who, immediately intervened to send him back and denying a referral. India's captain Virat Kohli, in his post-match interview, accused the team of having done that on at least three occasions; once as Smith was declared lbw, and twice as he batted, which he stated to having pointed out to the umpires. As the controversy broke out, Australia's Peter Handscomb tweeted admitting to have "referred" Smith to "look at the box". Picking on Smith having played down the incident terming it a "brain fade", Kohli said, "Honestly, if someone makes a mistake while batting, for me, personally, that's a brain fade. ... But if something is going on for three days, then that's not a brain fade, as simple as that."

Australia's coach Darren Lehmann dismissed Kohli's allegations and responded that his team "[n]ever, ever, ever" sought the dressing room's assistance. The CEO of Cricket Australia (CA), James Sutherland called the criticism "outrageous" and said, "We reject any commentary that suggests our integrity was brought into disrepute or that systemic unfair tactics are used, and stand by Steve and the Australian cricketers who are proudly representing our country." The Board of Control for Cricket in India (BCCI) responded with a statement: "BCCI has requested the ICC (International Cricket Council) to take cognisance of the fact that Smith admitted to a 'brain fade' at that moment. BCCI sincerely hopes that the rest of the matches are played in the true spirit of cricket." The ICC said it would not "press charges" against either teams or captains and added that ahead of the third Test, the match referee would "bring both captains together to remind them of their responsibilities to the game". However, the BCCI filed an official complaint against Steve Smith and Peter Handscomb with the ICC.

Notes

References

External links
 Series home at ESPN Cricinfo

2017 in Australian cricket
2017 in Indian cricket
International cricket competitions in 2016–17
Australian cricket tours of India